The Willow Senior Golf Classic is a men's senior (over 50) professional golf tournament on the European Senior Tour. It was held for the first time in September 2016 at Hanbury Manor Country Club, Ware, Hertfordshire, England. The event raises money for the Willow Foundation. The winner was Gary Marks who won the first prize of £52,500 out of total prize-money of £350,000.

Winners

External links
Coverage on the European Senior Tour's official site

European Senior Tour events
Golf tournaments in England
Recurring sporting events established in 2016